The John Steinbeck House at 16250 Greenwood Lane in Monte Sereno, California, was the home of author John Steinbeck from 1936 to 1938. The house was built in 1936, in the foothills of the Santa Cruz Mountains in what was then part of the town of Los Gatos, California, for Steinbeck and his wife, Carol. While living in the house, Steinbeck wrote The Grapes of Wrath and completed Of Mice and Men. The Steinbecks added a guest house to the property after the house's completion; renowned actors, literary agents, and friends of the Steinbecks stayed in the guest house while visiting the couple. In 1938, the Steinbecks left the house, as they felt that its location was no longer as secluded as it had been two years earlier.

The John Steinbeck House was added to the National Register of Historic Places on December 28, 1989. Unlike Steinbeck's birthplace in Salinas, California, this house is now a private residence home and is closed to the public.

See also
John Steinbeck House (Salinas, California), another Steinbeck residence on the NRHP

References

External links

John Steinbeck
Houses on the National Register of Historic Places in California
Houses in Santa Clara County, California
National Register of Historic Places in Santa Clara County, California
Historic districts on the National Register of Historic Places in California
1936 establishments in California
Houses completed in 1936